Don (Donald) Mitchell (1915-1993) was an American aircraft designer. He was a Scottish immigrant, arriving in the United States in 1922. He built his first airplane seven years later and founded an airplane manufacturing company in 1937.

Aircraft build
 Mitchell Nimbus
 Mitchell U-2 Superwing
 AmeriPlanes Mitchell Wing A-10
 Mitchell Wing B-10

References

Aircraft designers
American aerospace designers
1915 births
1993 deaths
British emigrants to the United States